Fuhrländer Wind Turbine Laasow is a wind turbine, built in 2006 near the village of Laasow, Brandenburg, Germany. It consists of a 160-metre lattice tower, which carries a rotor 90 metres in diameter. Until two slightly taller wind turbines opened in Poland in 2012, this Fuhrländer was the tallest wind turbine in the world. Its power output is 2.5 MW.

See also 

 List of tallest buildings and structures in the world
 Wind power in Germany
 De Noord, tallest traditional windmill in the world
 De Nolet, tallest "windmill", but actually is a disguised wind turbine

References

External links
 
 Fuhrländer Wind Turbine diagram at SkyscraperPage.com
 
 - video illustrating the construction and operation of this wind turbine

Towers in Germany
Economy of Brandenburg
Wind turbines